Lisa Daggs is an American multi-award-winning Christian music singer-songwriter, producer and author based in Nashville, Tennessee

She was born in Los Angeles, California, and was raised in Sacramento by her mother after her parents were divorced when she was ten. Trying to deal with the pressures of her teenage years and her parents' divorce, she eventually tried to ease her pain by medicating herself with drugs and alcohol. Lisa is now an accomplished, singer, song writer, producer, author, public speaker and the President of Serenity Records. Lisa has garnered 26 radio #1 hits and many awards throughout her career. She continues to receive accolades as an artist, author and producer.

Music career
Daggs launched her career by moving to Nashville where she worked as a studio vocalist and sang in numerous showcases for local Nashville songwriters. After a stint at performing in mainstream venues, she began touring with evangelist Lowell Lundstrom. In 1991, Daggs recorded her debut CD, Who Are You, which launched her career.

"Walls" and "Leave Your Bags at the Door," the first singles from Daggs album, Angel in Your Eyes, hit charts in top ten publications such as Music City News, The Gospel Voice, Clear Country and Christian Country Research Bulletin. "I Wanna Thank You," the album's third release, was Daggs' first No. 1 radio charting single. Lisa Daggs went on to top the charts with 17 No. 1 radio singles. Lisa along with her daughter, Faith Charette were a part of the Gaither "Women of Homecoming" video and recording. To date their single, "You Are My Ministry" has had over 750,000 views worldwide.

Her most recent work, "Christmas From My Heart" saw one single released in 2017 and will be fully released in the fall of 2018. 'Regardless" released in the fall of 2016 has seen both singles reach number 1 on the Nashville charts. The album is garnering much attention as her best work to date. "Well Worn" the self penned song about her mother Ilene, raced up the charts to number one, once again displaying the appeal Lisa Daggs has to her beloved fans. Recently Lisa Daggs stepped into the producer's chair to create "That's What I Do" for her husband, band member, songwriter and evangelist, Ronnie Horton who has seen increased exposure and enormous acceptance from fans as he performs his old school Country Gospel tunes. Reminiscent of Kenny Hinson, Ronnie has wowed audiences across the nation with his range and anointed songs. The project has seen all three releases, "For You and Me", "Unclouded Day" and "Call on Jesus" hit the top 10 on the Powersource Nashville Chart.

Lisa was awarded Inspirational Country Music Association's the "Entertainer of the Year" on the stage of the Grand Ole Opry by her long time friend Jason Crabb in April 2017, was nominated for a GMA Dove Award and is under contract for a Salem Publishing book detailing her life which is due out in October 2019. The book will be distributed through Amazon and will be marketed through Salem Media Group, Regnery Publishing. Lisa is proving to be a lasting force in the Christian music industry and is still going strong!

Radio
Daggs hosted a radio show entitled "Reality Check" which aired on Salem Media Group's 103.9 The Fish every Sunday at 7 pm. Reality Check featured "Recovery Talk on the Radio", a faith-based recovery program which is still available via podcast located on Lisa's website at www.lisadaggs.net

Television appearances

Daggs has made several appearances on the Bill Gaither Homecoming Video series. She has appeared on several mainstream television shows such as Prime Time Country and The 700 Club. Lisa recently opened the televised awards show for ICMA from the TBN stage in Nashville with her song, "Forgiveness Is A Powerful Thing" to rave reviews.

Awards

As a vocal performance artist Daggs has been honored with numerous awards, including The Gospel Voice's Diamond Award for "Country Artist of the Year" (other nominees included Charlie Daniels, Ricky Skaggs, Marty Raybon and LeAnn Rimes). She received the Christian Country Music Association's "Entertainer of the Year" and "New Artist of the Year" honors, while also being named "The Brightest Newcomer to the Scene" by the Christian Country Research Bulletin. In 2009 Daggs was among several artists to receive the Gospel Music Association's Dove Award nomination for Bill Gaither's Special Event album. Lisa was nominated for the 2016 ICMA Living Legends Award.

References

1965 births
Living people
Christian writers
American women country singers
American country singer-songwriters
Composers of Christian music
American performers of Christian music
21st-century American women singers
21st-century American singers